Yaakov Nimrodi (born 1 June 1926) is an Israeli businessman and former Israeli intelligence officer. Nimrodi, the father of Ofer Nimrodi, was the chairman of Maariv, which he acquired in 1992.

Biography
Yaakov Nimrodi was born in Jerusalem, one of ten children. He was recruited into intelligence work at the age of 16, by Yitzhak Navon, a childhood friend who later became President of Israel. Nimrodi joined a special unit of the Palmach which specialized in gathering intelligence on Arab countries. 

After Israeli independence in 1948, he was assigned to a military intelligence unit in the south of Israel, where he met Ariel Sharon, later Prime Minister of Israel. In 1956, he was appointed the IDF military attaché and Israel Defense Ministry representative in Tehran. There he was involved in Israel's large-scale arms sales to Iran in the 1960s. "No Israeli representative in Iran during the Shah's regime was more significant or influential than Nimrodi." During this time Nimrodi provided "advice and training" to Iran's SAVAK secret service.

Business career
Nimrodi returned to Israel after the fall of the Shah of Iran in 1979, but continued to be involved in arms trading, including a $135m sale of arms to Iran in 1981. Nimrodi played a central role in the early stages of the Iran-Contra affair. He published a book on the affair in 2004.

In 1987 Nimrodi acquired Israel Land Development Company for $26m. In 1992, he bought the Israeli newspaper Maariv

Published works
 התקווה והמחד: פרשת איראנגייט, Maariv Publishing, 2004 (Irangate: A Hope Shattered)

References

External links 
 Nimrodi Archive at YouTube

1926 births
Living people
Arms traders
Israeli businesspeople in real estate
Iraqi Jews
Israeli chief executives
Israeli Jews
Israeli people of Iraqi-Jewish descent
Maariv (newspaper) people
People of the Mossad